Maxime of Lyon was the 10th bishop of Lyon. He succeeds Vocius in the first half of the 4th century.

Very little is known of his life. His name is known to us from the various lists of the first archbishops of Lyon and chronicles the history of the Church of Lyon. It is sometimes likened to a Maximus mentioned in the Litany of the Church of Lyon but without no basis to this attachment.

References 

Bishops of Lyon
4th-century bishops in Gaul
Year of birth unknown
Year of death missing
4th-century Gallo-Roman people